Ułani, ułani, chłopcy malowani is a 1932 Polish military comedy film directed by Mieczysław Krawicz and produced by the Blok-Muzafilm studio with the participation of the 1st Light Cavalry Regiment. The film has been taken down by state censorship in 1938, allegedly for ridiculing the Polish Armed Forces. Not surprisingly, it has also been described as "one of the stupidest 'army farce' comedies in the twenty years between wars" (by Małgorzata Hendrykowska).

The film tells a story of two muffs posing as Uhlans to win the heart of a maid Helka, considered the prettiest of all girls in Grajdołek (a nominal name for boondocks in Polish). She catches them assuming to be thieves and brings them to the regiment, which is useless, because they originate from there.

Cast
 Kazimierz Krukowski (Lopek)
 Adolf Dymsza (Felek)
 Zula Pogorzelska (Helka)
 Mieczysław Frenkiel (mayor of Grajdołek town)
 Maria Chaveau (mayor's wife)
 Władysław Lenczewski (colonel, commander of the Uhlans)
 Tadeusz Wesołowski (adjutant Lieutenant)
 Władysław Walter (sergeant)
 Czesław Skonieczny (Butcher)
 Ryszard Misiewicz (Kogutek, municipal secretary)
 Stefania Betcherowa (Butcher's wife)

References

External links
 

1932 films
1932 comedy films
Films directed by Mieczysław Krawicz
Polish comedy films
Polish black-and-white films
1930s Polish-language films